The Kentucky Department of Criminal Investigation is an investigative law enforcement agency in the Commonwealth of Kentucky that operates under the authority of the Office of the Attorney General. The department was founded in September 2004 by former Kentucky Attorney General Greg Stumbo as the Kentucky Bureau of Investigation (KBI). The KBI was reorganized into the Department of Criminal Investigation by Stumbo's successor Jack Conway.

Branches 
DCI is a specialized agency with three different investigative branches.

 Public Integrity/Special Investigations

The primary objective of this unit it to guarantee that the government employees perform their duties in an honest and ethical manner. This task is completed by investigating allegations of criminal misconduct by state and local officials as well as misuse of public funds. The list of arenas that are investigated are extended to the executive and judicial level. This branch has retained the Commonwealth's first full-time statewide human trafficking detective. The people that work these cases put countless hours of work in each day trying to locate abusive exploiters who prey on individuals within Kentucky. The Kentucky Department of Criminal Investigation has taken the lead in Kentucky for the education and establishment of best-practice labor and sex trafficking investigations and training. 

2. Cyber Crimes 

The detectives who work in the Cyber Crimes unit investigate and target combative predators who solicit sex with underage boys and girls. This branch also has several digital forensic investigation capabilities. They are able to collect evidential documentation and files from different devices, which includes damaged or hidden information that may be crucial in an investigation. The detectives within this branch support local, state, and federal law enforcement agencies that do not have their own cyber investigation and forensic capabilities. 

3. Drug Investigations

The primary job of the Drug Investigations branch is to investigate the illegal distribution and over-prescribing of drugs by doctors, etc. The goal is to put an end to illegal drug practices in Kentucky, which in the long run will stop the excessive prescribing of opioids to the citizens of Kentucky. The detectives within this branch also investigate the sale of synthetic drugs and assist local agencies in the fight against the heroin epidemic.

See also
 List of law enforcement agencies in Kentucky

References
Robertson, Campbell. “A Century Ago, Miners Fought in a Bloody Uprising. Few Know about It Today.” The New York Times, The New York Times, 6 Sept. 2021, 

 https://www.nytimes.com/2021/09/06/us/coal-miners-blair-mountain.html.

Crandall, William “Rick,” and Richard E. Crandall. “Revisiting the Hawks Nest Tunnel Incident: Lessons Learned from an American Tragedy.” Journal of Appalachian Studies, vol. 8, no. 2, [Appalachian Studies Association, Inc., University of Illinois Press], 2002, pp. 261–83, http://www.jstor.org/stable/41446542. 

 https://ag.ky.gov/about/Office-Divisions/DCI/Pages/default.aspx

External links
 Official Website for the Kentucky Department of Criminal Investigation

2004 establishments in Kentucky
Crime in Kentucky
Criminal Investigation
State law enforcement agencies of Kentucky
State Bureaus of Investigation